Gibson Flats is a census-designated place (CDP) in Cascade County, Montana, United States. The population was 199 at the 2010 census. It is part of the Great Falls, Montana Metropolitan Statistical Area.

Geography

Demographics

References

Census-designated places in Cascade County, Montana
Census-designated places in Montana